The Vice Chief of the Defence Force (VCDF) is the military deputy to the Chief of the Defence Force (CDF) of Australia, and acts as the CDF in his absence under standing acting arrangements. Vice Admiral David Johnston, the incumbent VCDF, has held the position since 5 July 2018.

Responsibilities
Created in 1986, the VCDF is a three-star officer in the Australian Defence Force (lieutenant general, vice admiral, or air marshal). The position's standing responsibilities include: Joint Doctrine, Education, Training and Evaluation; Joint Logistics; Reserve Policy; and Joint Capabilities, Commitments and Concepts. When acting as Chief of the Defence Force, the VCDF attends the National Security Committee of Cabinet (NSCC) and Secretary’s Committee on National Security (SCNS).

Until September 2007, the VCDF was "double hatted" as the Chief of Joint Operations (CJOPS). In this role he commanded Australian Defence Force operations on behalf of the Chief of the Defence Force. In September 2007, the Minister of Defence, Brendan Nelson announced the formation of a separate three-star CJOPS position based at the Headquarters Joint Operations Command (HQJOC) facility at Bungendore, New South Wales.

Appointment
The appointment is made by the Governor General on the advice of his/her ministers under Section 9AA of the Defence Act (1903) and is for a fixed term of four years, nominally rotated between the three services, Navy, Army and Air Force; however in practice this has not been the case and the appointment has been held for longer or shorter periods of time. The role is politically neutral, as are all military positions, and is not affected by a change of government.

VCDF Group
The Vice Chief of the Defence Force Group is responsible for the provision of military strategic effects and commitments advice and planning, joint military professional education and training, logistics support, health support, ADF cadet and reserve policy, joint capability coordination, preparedness management, and joint and combined ADF doctrine.

The Military Strategic Commitments Division (MSCD) provides and coordinates ADF tri-service and joint strategic advice across the Australian Government (including the Headquarters Joint Operations Command and the Defence Strategic Policy and Intelligence Group) and situational awareness for current and potential ADF commitments. The Head Military Strategic Commitments is also responsible for the Australian Defence Force Investigative Service, strategic communications, strategic crisis response, the Australian Defence Force Parliamentary Program, and engagement with the United Nations and other coalition partners.

The Military Strategic Plans Division (MSPD) provides strategic planning linking policy and operational arrangements. 

The Force Integration Division (FID) is responsible for the design, development, integration and coordination of ADF joint warfare capabilities, including information systems, effects-based operations, and counter-IED efforts.

The Force Design Division is responsible for the provision of guidance and planning for future joint force design, requirements, and capabilities of the ADF.

Appointees
The following list chronologically records those who have held the post of Vice Chief of the Defence Force. Rank and honours are as at the completion of the individual's term.

Timeline

References

Australian Defence Force
Leadership of the Australian Defence Force
Military appointments of Australia